The 2020 PDC Pro Tour was a series of non-televised darts tournaments organised by the Professional Darts Corporation (PDC). Players Championships and European Tour events are the events that make up the Pro Tour. There were 27 PDC Pro Tour events held, 23 Players Championships and 4 European Tour events.

This page also includes results from the PDC's affiliated tours including the Development and Challenge Tours and all the regional tours as well as the results from the World Championship regional qualifiers. There were 10 Challenge Tour events, 10 Development Tour events, 2 PDC Nordic and Baltic Events, 6 Dartplayers Australia Pro Tour events, 3 EuroAsian Darts Corporation Pro Tour Events and 8 Championship Darts Circuit Pro Tour events during the 2020 season.

All tours were disrupted, and in the case of the PDC Asian Tour cancelled, as a result of the COVID-19 pandemic.

Prize money
The prize money for the Players Championship and European Tour events was unchanged from the 2019 levels.

This is how the prize money is divided:

PDC Tour Card
128 players are granted Tour Cards, which enables them to participate in all Players Championships events, the UK Open and all the European Tour events.

Tour cards

The 2020 Tour Cards are awarded to:
 (64) The top 64 players from the PDC Order of Merit after the 2020 World Championship. 
  resigned his card, and therefore,  moved into the top 64.
  resigned his card, and therefore,  moved into the top 64.
 (25) 25 qualifiers from 2019 Q-School not ranked in the top 64 of the PDC Order of Merit following the World Championship.
  resigned his Tour Card.
 (2) Two highest qualifiers from 2018 Challenge Tour ( and ).
 (2) Two highest qualifiers from 2018 Development Tour ( and ).
 (2) Two highest qualifiers from 2019 Challenge Tour ( and ).
 (2) The highest qualifiers from 2019 Development Tour ( and ).
 (12) The 12 qualifiers from the 2020 Qualifying Schools.

Afterwards, the playing field will be complemented by the highest qualified players from the Q School Order of Merit until the maximum number of 128 Pro Tour Card players had been reached. In 2020, that means that a total of 19 players will qualify this way.

Q-School
The PDC Pro Tour Qualifying School (or Q-School) was split into a UK and European Q-School. Players that are not from Europe could choose which Q-School they wanted to compete in.

The UK Q-School took place at the Robin Park Arena in Wigan from 16 to 19 January.
The European Q-School took place at Halle 39 in Hildesheim from 16 to 19 January.
The following players won two-year tour cards on each of the days played:

An Order of Merit was also created for each Q School. For every win after the first full round (without byes) the players were awarded 1 point.

To complete the field of 128 Tour Card Holders, places were allocated down the final Qualifying School Order of Merits in proportion to the number of entrants. The following players picked up Tour Cards as a result:

UK Q-School Order of Merit
 
 
 
 
 
 
 
 
 
 
 
 

European Q-School Order of Merit

Players Championships
The Players Championship events was scheduled to be 30 events as normal, but due to the COVID-19 pandemic, a significant number of events were postponed, including all from mid-March to the end of June. The PDC scheduled five events from July 8 at the Marshall Arena, Milton Keynes, to make up. These events were branded the "PDC Summer Series". Following this a "PDC Autumn Series" was arranged in Niedernhausen, Germany, with a "PDC Winter Series" following in Coventry.

European Tour
The European Tour was announced at 13 events, including events in Belgium and Hungary for the first time. Due to the COVID-19, only 4 events will take place with the others having been cancelled.

PDC Challenge Tour

The Challenge Tour was planned to increase from 20 to 24 events for 2020, but due to the COVID-19 pandemic in the United Kingdom was only ten events.

The top two players win a Two-Year PDC Tour Card for 2021–20, with the players finishing from third to eighth earning free entry to the 2021 PDC Q-School. The Order of Merit leader is also invited to compete in the 2020/21 World Darts Championship.

David Evans topped the rankings and qualified for the World Championship and was awarded a Tour Card for the next two years, while Ritchie Edhouse took second and also earned a Tour Card.

The top eight unqualified players will also qualify for the 2021 UK Open.

PDC Development Tour

The Development Tour was planned with 20 events for 2020, but due to the COVID-19 pandemic in the United Kingdom there were only ten events. 

The top two players earned a PDC Tour Card for 2021/2022, with the players from third to eighth receiving free entry to the 2021 PDC Q-School (if they do not already possess a Tour Card). The top two players also earned a place in the 2021 PDC World Darts Championship. 

Ryan Meikle topped the Development Tour Order of Merit, with Keane Barry finishing second, both gaining their place at the 2021 World Championship. As Meikle is already a Tour Card holder, the second automatic tour card goes to the third ranked Berry van Peer, with Barry being the other Tour Card winner.

The top eight unqualified players also qualified for the 2021 UK Open.

PDC Women's Series

The PDC Women's Series was introduced to replace the separate World Championship qualifiers that had been held the last two years. The top two players both qualified for the World Championship.

Tour Card holder Lisa Ashton topped the weekend table with two event victories to qualify for the 2021 PDC World Darts Championship. Though Deta Hedman and Fallon Sherrock tied the weekend on earnings, Hedman was granted the second spot on the tiebreaker with 85 legs won over the series to Sherrock's 83 legs won.

Professional Darts Corporation Nordic & Baltic (PDCNB)
The Professional Darts Corporation Nordic & Baltic Tour had 10 events scheduled. Due to the COVID-19 pandemic, planned events in Copenhagen and Gothenburg were postponed. A planned season restart in Riga was also cancelled, and the season was settled based on the first two events.

Professional Darts Corporation Asian Tour
The Professional Darts Corporation Asian Tour was scaled down to 10 events, taking place from August to November. The postponements were due to the COVID-19 pandemic. On 11 August 2020, the Tour was cancelled.

Dartplayers Australia (DPA) Pro Tour
The DPA Tour was suspended after the sixth event and was not restarted in 2020. Gordon Mathers, who was top of the DPA rankings at the time of the suspension, took the place at the 2021 PDC World Darts Championship.

EuroAsian Darts Corporation (EADC) Pro Tour
Originally six events were due to take place on the EADC Tour, but owing to the COVID-19 pandemic, only the first three took place.

Championship Darts Corporation (CDC) Pro Tour
The Championship Darts Corporation hosted a tour of 8 events held over 2 weekends, one in the United States and one in Canada. Players are only able to enter the events held in their own country and the top player from each group of 4 events will qualify for the 2021 PDC World Darts Championship. There were originally due to be more events, but the schedule was heavily disrupted by the COVID-19 pandemic.

Matt Campbell and Danny Baggish topped the Canadian and USA Series Order of Merits respectively and qualified for the World Championship.

Canadian Tour

USA Tour

World Championship International Qualifiers

References

 
PDC Pro Tour
2020 in darts